No. 14 Repair & Salvage Unit RAAF was a maintenance unit of the Royal Australian Air Force during World War II.

History
Formed at Mount Druitt Aerodrome at Mount Druitt, New South Wales, Australia on 21 July 1943.

The unit was disbanded on 30 October 1945.

Aircraft Repairs undertaken upon
 Bristol Beaufort
 Curtiss P-40 Kittyhawk 
 de Havilland Tiger Moth
 Lockheed Ventura
 CAC Wirraway

Locations
Mount Druitt Aerodrome - 21 July 1943
Pell Airfield - 19 March 1944
Livingstone Airfield - 13 April 1944
Ross River Aerodrome - 23 May 1944
Woodstock Aerodrome - 8 October 1944
Morotai Airfield - 12 March 1945

Commanding Officers
 Squadron Leader R.H. Foord - 3 August 1943
 Squadron Leader N.B. Tamlyn - 16 August 1943
 Squadron Leader O. Doutch - 19 October 1943
 Squadron Leader N.S. Lake - August 1945

References

1